William Wells (c. 1770 – 15 August 1812), also known as Apekonit ("Carrot top"), was the son-in-law of Chief Little Turtle of the Miami.  He fought for the Miami in the Northwest Indian War.  During the course of that war, he became a United States Army officer, and also served in the War of 1812.

Apekonit of the Miami
Wells was born at Jacob's Creek, Pennsylvania, in 1770. He was the son of Samuel Wells, a captain in the Virginia militia during the American Revolutionary War.  The family moved to Louisville, Kentucky, in 1779 and settled on Beargrass Creek when William was nine and, shortly after, his mother died. After Miami warriors ambushed settlers evacuating Squire Boone's station in 1782, Wells' father was killed in a second ambush the following day, and young Wells went to live with the family of William Pope. Two years later in 1784, he and three other boys were taken captive by an Eel River Miami and Delaware raiding party and taken to Indiana.  Wells was 13 years old at the time.

Wells was adopted by a chief named Gaviahate ("Porcupine"), and raised in the village of Kenapakomoko (Snakefish Town) on the Eel River, six miles north from Logansport in northern Indiana. His Miami name was "Apekonit" (carrot), perhaps in reference to his red hair.  He seems to have adapted to Miami life quite well and accompanied war parties – perhaps even serving to decoy flatboats along the Ohio River.

Wells was located and visited by his brother Cary around 1788 or 1789.  He visited his family in Louisville but remained with the Miami, perhaps because he had married a Wea woman and had a child.  His wife and daughter were later captured in a raid by General James Wilkinson in 1791 and taken to Cincinnati. Meanwhile, under the command of the great Miami war chief Little Turtle, Wells led a group of Miami sharpshooters at St. Clair's defeat in 1791, the biggest victory the Native Americans ever won against the U. S. Army. The next year, in an effort to free the Indians held hostage, Wells returned to Louisville. In Louisville his brother Sam encouraged him to travel to Cincinnati to meet with Rufus Putnam, who hired Wells to help him make a treaty with the Native Americans in Vincennes, where the hostages were freed.  Putnam then hired Wells to spy on the confederated Indian councils in 1792 and 1793 along the Maumee River in northwest Ohio.

While his first wife was held captive in Cincinnati, Wells married Little Turtle's daughter Wanagapeth ("Sweet Breeze"), with whom he had four children. The children of Wells and Wanagapeth were Anne, wife of Dr. William Turner of Fort Wayne; Mary, wife of James Wolcott; Rebecca, wife of James Hackley of Fort Wayne; Jane Turner, wife of John H. Griggs; and William Wayne Wells, a graduate of the United States Military Academy at West Point.

On 11 September 1793, Wells arrived at Fort Jefferson with news of the Grand Council's failure, blaming the failure of the council on Alexander McKee and Simon Girty. He also brought a dire warning that a force of over 1500 warriors was ready to attack Fort Jefferson and the Legion of the United States, then camped near Fort Washington.

Wells became the equivalent of a captain in the Legion of the United States, acting as the head of an elite group of spies and interpreter and agreeing to obey the orders of General "Mad Anthony" Wayne "as far as practicable." Captain Wells led the First Sub-Legion to the battleground of St. Clair's Defeat (which he had fought in) and located several abandoned U.S. cannons that the Native Americans had buried. General Wayne ordered the Legion to bury the bones found and then build Fort Recovery on the battle site.  Wells's scouts led the way when Wayne's legion marched toward the Maumee in the summer of 1794. When Native American forces under Blue Jacket attacked Fort Recovery on 30 June 1794, Wells warned of the danger and afterwards led a scouting mission that discovered British officers who had brought cannonballs and powder, not knowing that the United States had already recovered the buried cannons.

Wells was wounded a few days before the Battle of Fallen Timbers when, on a dare, he led his group of spies into a camp of 15 Delaware warriors and struck up a casual conversation.  The spies fled when they were finally discovered, but Wells was shot in the hand and received fractures to his wrist. He still was able to give Wayne crucial advice about when to attack that helped secure the victory. The next year he was an interpreter for the Wabash Indians (Miami, Eel River, Wea, Piankeshaw, Kickapoo, and Kaskaskia) at the Treaty of Greenville, in which the Indian confederation ceded most of Ohio. As interpreter he stood between his father-in-law Little Turtle, who was the only chief to vigorously resist the terms imposed, and General Wayne, Wells's commander in chief. Little Turtle, who was the last to sign the treaty, requested that Wells be sent as an Indian agent to the Miami stronghold of Kekionga, now under American control and renamed Fort Wayne.

William Wells, U.S. Indian Agent

Following the Treaty of Greenville, Chief Little Turtle asked that Wells be appointed as a US Indian Agent to the Miami.  The U.S. built an agent's house in the newly renamed Fort Wayne, and William and Sweet Breeze, with their children, moved from Kentucky to resettle with the Miami.  At the suggestion of General Wayne, Little Turtle and Wells traveled to Philadelphia to visit President George Washington.  They were warmly received.  Washington presented Little Turtle with a ceremonial sword, and Wells was given a pension of $20 a month, in compensation for his wounds at Fallen Timbers.  The two traveled east again in 1797 to visit the new president, John Adams.

When Thomas Jefferson became the United States' third president, Wells requested that he establish a trading post at Fort Wayne to encourage friendly relations with the area natives.  Jefferson did establish the post, but appointed John Johnston as manager. Wells was expected to implement Jefferson's Indian policy, which called for "civilizing" the Indians while, at the same time, using treaties to gain as much of their land as quickly as possible. Johnston and Wells did not work well together, and each quickly came to resent the other. Territorial Governor William Henry Harrison at first favored Wells, and appointed him a Justice of the Peace. Wells was also charged with establishing a mail route between Fort Wayne and Fort Dearborn.  Wells' good standing with Harrison would soon sour, however, when he sided with Little Turtle in opposition to the 1804 Treaty of Vincennes, which gave large amounts of land to the Americans for settlement.  Harrison responded by accusing Wells of opposing the Quaker Agriculture missions to the Miami. Wells appealed to General James Wilkinson, but Wilkinson sided with Harrison and Johnston.

In 1805, Governor Harrison sent General John Gibson and Colonel Francis Vigo to investigate Wells and Little Turtle on suspicion of fiscal corruption and instigation of the Miami against the United States.  Their report concluded that Wells "seems more attentive to the Indians than the people of the United States."

After Sweet Breeze died in 1805, William sent his daughters to live with his brother, Samuel Wells, in Kentucky. He and Little Turtle traveled to Vincennes, where they gave a "friendly disposition ... toward the government," Harrison wrote. "With Captain Wells, I have had an explanation, and have agreed to a general amnesty and act of oblivion for the past." William and Little Turtle signed Harrison's Treaty of Grouseland. In 1808, however, Wells led a group of Indian chiefs from different tribes, including Miami Chiefs Little Turtle and Richardville, to Washington, D.C. to meet directly with President Jefferson. This infuriated Secretary of War Henry Dearborn, who fired Wells and replaced him with his rival, John Johnston.

In 1809, William married his third wife, Mary Geiger, daughter of Colonel Frederick Geiger. They and Wells' four children returned to Fort Wayne, where he received a discharge from the new U.S. Indian agent John Johnston. That Autumn, the Treaty of Fort Wayne was signed.  This new land deal led directly to a more militant stance on the part of Tecumseh and his brother. Wells warned the government about this new and dangerous development, but he was largely ignored in Washington, DC while earning the hatred of Tecumseh and his followers. 

Wells had the support of the Miami chiefs and of Kentucky Senator John Pope and went to Washington, DC to challenge Johnston's decision. Ultimately, Wells' position was left in the hands of territorial Governor William Henry Harrison who, though distrustful of Wells, sided with the Miami out of fear that they could join Tecumseh if provoked. William Wells continued to act as United States Indian Agent in Fort Wayne, and was able to keep the Miami out of Tecumseh's confederacy.  He was the first to warn United States Secretary of War Henry Dearborn in 1807, of the growing movement led by Tecumseh and his brother. William's eldest brother, Colonel Samuel Wells, and his father-in-law, Frederick Geiger, were both at the Battle of Tippecanoe; Geiger was wounded in the initial attack.

Wells also established and managed a farm in Fort Wayne, which he jointly owned with his friend Jean François Hamtramck. He petitioned Congress for a  tract of land at the confluence of the St. Joseph and St. Mary rivers in 1807, which was granted and signed by President Jefferson. Little Turtle died in his home in 1812, and was buried nearby.

Fort Dearborn

In 1812, the Madison administration failed to notify the frontier that the United States was about to declare war on Great Britain.  As a result, the British and Indians knew several days before the Americans that hostilities had broken out. Hundreds of Potawatomi warriors surrounded Fort Dearborn (present day Chicago) and demanded its surrender. Wells led a group of Miami Indians from Fort Wayne, Indiana, to aid the evacuation of Fort Dearborn. Among the Americans under siege at Fort Dearborn was his niece Rebekah Wells, wife of the post commander Nathan Heald. Wells' intent was to offer protection to the garrison and their families – about 96 people, about a third of which were women and children – as they abandoned the post and walked east to Fort Wayne.  Negotiating with the Pottawattomi, who surrounded the fort along the Chicago River, they were allowed to leave the fort, but the destruction of whiskey and guns enraged the Pottawattomi, who then attacked once they had marched south from the fort, a massacre known as the Battle of Fort Dearborn. Nathan and Rebekah Heald were both wounded, but were taken into captivity by the Pottawattomi and eventually ransomed to the British.

Wells, who was acting as a scout in advance of the party, knew the Indians would attack and had painted his face black: a sign of bravery, a sign to the Pottawattomi that he knew their intentions, and as a sign that he knew he was going to die. As the evacuated garrison walked down the beach, Wells rode in advance to keep an eye on the Pottawattomi, and he was one of the first to fall when they attacked. The "battle" took place in the dunes along Lake Michigan about a mile south of the Chicago River, in what is now downtown Chicago.  Wells was shot and killed by the Potowatamis. His opponents, although considering him a traitor to their cause, nonetheless sought to gain some of his courage by consuming his heart.

Wells had a will dated 1810 that instructed his wife Mary "Polly" and five of his children to “share and share alike.”  Polly remarried in 1817 to Robert Turner in Louisville.

Legacy

The following are named for William Wells:
Wells Street in Chicago, Illinois
Wells County, Indiana
Wells Street in Fort Wayne, Indiana

Notes

References 

William Wells at ohiohistorycentral.org
The U.S. Library of Congress has a 10 May 1801 letter written by William Wells to Meriwether Lewis—then secretary to President Thomas Jefferson, requesting a meeting between Little Turtle and President Jefferson.

1770 births
1812 deaths
American people of the Northwest Indian War
History of Chicago
Miami people
People from Fort Wayne, Indiana
People from Indiana in the War of 1812
United States Indian agents
American military personnel killed in the War of 1812